Naser Malek Motiei (29 March 1930 – 25 May 2018) was an Iranian actor and director. He starred in numerous films and television shows. However after the Iranian Revolution in 1979, he mostly stopped acting and pivoted into other career choices.

Filmography

 1949 
 1950 Vagabond
 1952 The Enchanter
 1952 
 1953 
 1955 
 1956 
 1958 Broken Spell
 1958 The Runaway Bride
 1959 The Twins
 1959 Woman's Enemy
 1960 Calm Before the Storm
 1960 The Stars Glitter
 1960 The Number One Body
 1961 Bitter Honey
 1961 The Bum
 1961 Uncle No-Ruz
 1962 The Merchants of Death
 1962 The Shadow of Fate
 1962 The Velvet Hat
 1963 Aras Khan
 1963 Men and Roads
 1963 The Polite Ones
 1964 Abraham in Paris
 1964 The Pleasures of Sin
 1965 A Perfect Gentleman
 1966 Running Away from Truth
 1966 Hashem khan
 1966 Hossein Kord Shabestari
 1969 Qeysar
 1969 Kölen Olayim
 1970 Avare asik
 1970 Wood Pigeon (Toghi) – directed by Ali Hatami
 1970 Dancer of City
 1970 The Coin of Luck
 1971 A Hut across the River
 1971 Baba Shamal
 1971 Gholam Zhandarm
 1971 Kako
 1971 Knucklebones
 1971 Looti
 1971 Noghre-dagh
 1971 Pahlevan Mofrad
 1971 The Bridge
 1972 Ghalandar
 1972 Mehdi in Black and Hot Mini Pants
 1973 Sheikh Saleh
 1973 Riot
 1974 Agha Mehdi Vared Mishavad
 1974 Oosta Karim Nokaretim
 1974 Salat-e zohr
 1974 Ten Little Indians
 1974 Soltan-e Sahebgharan (TV mini-series)
 1974 Torkaman
 1975 Golden Heel
 1976 Southern Fire
 1976 Idol
 1976 Deprem
 1977 Baraj
 1977 Sine-chak
 1982 The Imperilled
 2014 Negar's Role

References

External links

 
 

1930 births
2018 deaths
Iranian male film actors
Iranian film directors
Iranian real estate brokers
People from Tehran